D41 is a state road in the central Croatia connecting Križevci to Koprivnica and Gola border crossing to Hungary.

The road, as well as all other state roads in Croatia, is managed and maintained by Hrvatske ceste, a state-owned company.

Traffic volume 

Traffic is regularly counted and reported by Hrvatske ceste, one of the operators of the road.

Road junctions and populated areas

Maps

Sources

D041
D041
D041